The Javan owlet (Glaucidium castanopterum) is a species of owl in the family Strigidae.
It is native to the islands of Java and Bali.

Its natural habitat is subtropical or tropical moist lowland forests.

References

Javan owlet
Birds of Java
Birds of Bali
Javan owlet
Taxonomy articles created by Polbot